The Walkley Book Award is an Australian award presented annually by the Walkley Foundation for excellence in long-form journalism and nonfiction, with subjects ranging from biography to true crime to investigative journalism and reporting.

Winners 

 2005: Bob Connolly, Making Black Harvest
 2006: Neil Chenoweth, Packer's Lunch: A Rollicking Tale of Swiss Bank Accounts and Money-Making
 2007: Chris Masters, Jonestown: The Power and the Myth of Alan Jones
 2008: Don Watson, American Journeys
 2009: Graham Freudenberg, Churchill and Australia
 2010: Shirley Shackleton, The Circle of Silence: A Personal Testimony Before, During and After Balibo
 2011: Russell Skelton, King Brown Country: The Betrayal of Papunya
 2012: George Megalogenis, The Australian Moment: How We Were Made For These Times
 2013: Pamela Williams, Killing Fairfax: Packer, Murdoch and the Ultimate Revenge
 2014: Paul Kelly, Triumph and Demise: The Broken Promise of a Labor Generation
 2015: Chip Le Grand, The Straight Dope: The Inside Story of Sport's Biggest Drug Scandal
 2016: Stan Grant, Talking To My Country
 2017: Louise Milligan, Cardinal: The Rise and Fall of George Pell
 2018: Helen Pitt, The House: The dramatic story of the Sydney Opera House and the people who made it
 2019: Leigh Sales, Any Ordinary Day : Blindsides, Resilience and What Happens After the Worst Day of Your Life
 2020: Lucie Morris-Marr, Fallen: The inside story of the secret trial and conviction of Cardinal George Pell
 2021: Kate Holden, The Winter Road
 2022: Bronwyn Adcock, Currowan: The story of a fire and a community during Australia’s worst summer

References 

Australian literary awards
Awards established in 2005